Stakhanov may refer to:

 Stakhanov (surname), a Russian surname
 Kapitalna coal mine, Ukrain, formerly named Stakhanov coal mine
 Stakhanov Railway Car Building Works, Ukraine
 Kadiivka, a city in Ukraine, formerly named Stakhanov

See also
 Stakhanovite movement, diligent and enthusiastic workers in the former Soviet Union
 Alexei Stakhanov, the model Stakhanovite